La La Land is a 2016 American musical romantic drama film.

La La Land may also refer to:

 a nickname for Los Angeles

Film and television 
 La La Land (TV series), a 2010 comedy series starring Marc Wootton
 La La Land, a 2008 TV film starring Robert Rusler

Music 
 La La Land (Ed Hall album) (1995)
 La La Land (Plants and Animals album) (2010)
 La La Land (Wax Fang album) (2007)
 La La Land (soundtrack) (2016)
 "La La Land" (Green Velvet song) (2001)
 Live from La La Land, a live album by Jon Anderson (2007)
 "La La Land" (Demi Lovato song) (2008)
 "La La Land" (Bryce Vine song) (2019)
 "La La Land", a 1997 song by All Star United from eponymous album
 "La La Land", a 2009 song by Aimee Allen from A Little Happiness
 "La-La-Land", a 1998 song by Big Daddy Kane from Veteranz' Day
 "La-La-Land", a 2001 song by The Go-Go's from God Bless the Go-Go's
 "La La Land", a 2016 song by Jax
 "La La Land", a 1996 song by Shihad from Shihad
La-La Land, a Burbank, California record company founded in 2002 specializing in film and television soundtracks
 La-La Land, a record label notable for the 1994 release of the single "Jack Names the Planets" by Ash

See also
 Fantasy-prone personality
 Lolland or Laaland, an island in Denmark